The 1989 Trans America Athletic Conference baseball tournament was held at Conrad Park on the campus of Stetson University in DeLand, Florida. This was the eleventh tournament championship held by the Trans America Athletic Conference, in its eleventh year of existence.  won their second consecutive and overall tournament championship and earned the conference's automatic bid to the 1989 NCAA Division I baseball tournament.

Format and seeding 
The top two finishers from each division by conference winning percentage qualified for the tournament, with the top seed from one division playing the second seed from the opposite in the first round.

Bracket

All-Tournament Team 
The following players were named to the All-Tournament Team.

Most Valuable Player 
Mike Pinckes was named Tournament Most Valuable Player. Pinckes was a third baseman for Stetson.

References 

Tournament
ASUN Conference Baseball Tournament
1989 in sports in Florida